Roy Horace Welmaker (December 6, 1913 – February 3, 1998), nicknamed "Snookie", was an American professional baseball pitcher in the Negro leagues. He played from 1932 to 1953.

A native of Atlanta, Georgia, Welmaker served in the US Army during World War II.

Welmaker was the opening pitcher for the 1942 Negro World Series. He lost his first start to Jack Matchett of the Kansas City Monarchs, as a late inning rally meant a 8-0 loss. He would return to start Game 1 and Game 5 of the 1944 Negro World Series, winning both times against the Birmingham Black Barons and pitchers Johnny Markham and Alfred Saylor. In the 1945 Negro World Series, he was the starting pitcher for Game 1 against Bill Jefferson, but he allowed the go-ahead run to score in the eighth while allowing just six hits and two runs. He returned to start Game 3 against Jeff Jefferson, but Welmaker allowed four runs to score on seven hits as Cleveland won the third game of what proved to be a sweep of the defending champions. Overall, Welmaker had a 2–3 record in the Series over five games in three years.

In 1946 while playing for Sabios de Vargas, he pitched in 25 of the 30 games of the LVBP inaugural season, including 25 starts, and posted a 12-8 record with 139 strikeouts and a 2.68 earned run average (ERA) in 181⅔ innings of work. Welmaker led the league in victories, strikeouts and ERA to easily win the Triple crown. He died in Decatur, Georgia in 1998 at age 84.

References

External links
 and Seamheads
Venezuelan Professional Baseball League statistics

1913 births
1998 deaths
African-American baseball players
Algodoneros de Torreón players
American expatriate baseball players in Mexico
Atlanta Black Crackers players
Baseball players from Atlanta
Hollywood Stars players
Homestead Grays players
Leones de Ponce players
Mexican League baseball pitchers
Navegantes del Magallanes players
American expatriate baseball players in Venezuela
Patriotas de Venezuela players
Philadelphia Stars players
Portland Beavers players
Sabios de Vargas players
San Diego Padres (minor league) players
Wilkes-Barre Indians players
United States Army personnel of World War II
20th-century African-American sportspeople